Juraj Ljubić (born 26 May 2000) is a Croatian professional footballer who plays as a midfielder for Bosnian Premier League club Široki Brijeg.

Club career
In January 2020, Ljubić joined Osijek where he started for the clubs reserve team, playing in the Croatian 2. HNL.

On 4 February 2021, he signed a two-and-a-half-year contract with Bosnian Premier League club Zrinjski Mostar. Ljubić made his official debut for the club on 27 February 2021, in a league game against Krupa.

In July 2021, he left Zrinjski and joined Posušje.

International career
Ljubić represented Croatia on various youth levels.

References

External links

2000 births
Living people
Sportspeople from Mostar
Association football midfielders
Croatian footballers
Croatia youth international footballers
GNK Dinamo Zagreb players
S.P.A.L. players
NK Inter Zaprešić players
NK Osijek players
HŠK Zrinjski Mostar players
HŠK Posušje players
NK Široki Brijeg players
Croatian Football League players
First Football League (Croatia) players
Premier League of Bosnia and Herzegovina players
Croatian expatriate footballers
Expatriate footballers in Italy
Croatian expatriate sportspeople in Italy
Expatriate footballers in Bosnia and Herzegovina
Croatian expatriate sportspeople in Bosnia and Herzegovina